Guirgo may refer to:

Guirgo, Bazèga, Burkina Faso
Guirgo, Boulkiemdé, Burkina Faso